Erechthias ascensionae is a moth of the  family Tineidae. It is endemic to Ascension Island.

The length of the forewings is 5–6 mm. The forewings are predominantly pale whitish cream, irrorated (speckled) with scattered dark brown scales. The hindwings are uniformly pale greyish brown.

The larvae are most likely plant detritivores or lichenivorous.

Etymology
The species name is derived from the genitive case of the type locality.

References

Moths described in 2013
Erechthiinae